Ian Jeffrey is an English art historian, writer and curator.

Jeffrey is the author of a series of illustrated books on the history of photography. He is a recipient of the Royal Photographic Society's J. Dudley Johnston Award.

Life and work
Jeffrey has held the posts of tutor and professor at Goldsmiths, University of London.

Publications

Publications by Jeffrey
The Real Thing: An Anthology of British Photographs 1840–1950, London: Arts Council of Great Britain, 1974.
Photography: A Concise History. London: Thames & Hudson, 1981, 1989. .
The British Landscape 1920-1950. London: Thames & Hudson, 1984. .
Timeframes: The Story of Photography. New York City: Watson-Guptill, 1998. .
An American Journey: The Photography of William England. Munich; New York; London: Prestel, 1999. .
ReVisions: An Alternative History of Photography. Bradford: National Museum of Photography, Film and Television, 1999. .
The Photography Book. London: Phaidon, 2005. .
Second, revised edition. London: Phaidon, 2014. .
How to Read a Photograph: Understanding, Interpreting and Enjoying the Great Photographers. London: Thames & Hudson, 2009. .

Publications edited by Jeffrey
Cityscape 1910-39: Urban Themes in American, German and British Art. London: Arts Council of Great Britain, 1977. . Exhibition catalogue.
Bill Brandt: Photographs 1928-1983. London: Thames & Hudson, 1994. .
Josef Sudek. Phaidon 55. London; New York: Phaidon, 2001. .
Shomei Tomatsu. London; New York: Phaidon, 2001. .
Magnum Landscape. London; New York: Phaidon, 2005. .
The Art of Kyffin Williams. London: Royal Academy of Arts, 2007. With Nicholas Sinclair. .
Bill Brandt. Photofile. London: Thames & Hudson, 2007. .

Awards
2005: J. Dudley Johnston Award, Royal Photographic Society, Bath. Shared with David Alan Mellor.

Exhibitions

Exhibitions of Jeffrey's photographs
Universal Pictures, Kettle's Yard, Cambridge, 2005/2006

Exhibitions curated by Jeffrey
The Real Thing, Hayward Gallery, 1974. Curated by Jeffrey and David Alan Mellor.
Cityscape 1910-39: Urban Themes in American, German and British Art, Cartwright Hall, Bradford, 1977; City Museum and Art Gallery, Portsmouth, 1977; Laing Art Gallery, Newcasle-upon-Tyne, 1977; Royal Academy of Arts, London, 1978. Curated by Jeffrey and David Alan Mellor.

References

External links
"How to read a photograph" in pictures at The Guardian

Living people
British non-fiction writers
British art historians
British art critics
British male writers
Year of birth missing (living people)
Male non-fiction writers